Augustine Washington Jr. (1720–1762) was a Virginia planter, soldier, member of the House of Burgesses and elder half-brother of George Washington.

Early and family life
A member of the Washington family. He was the third and youngest son of Augustine Washington and Jane Butler, and an elder half-brother of George Washington.

Augustine Washington Jr. married Anne Aylett at "Nominy Plantation." She was the daughter and coheiress of William Aylett of Westmoreland County, Virginia. The couple had four children, of whom William Augustine Washington would follow in his father's footsteps as a planter and during 1788 represented Westmoreland County in the Virginia House of Delegates.

Career

According to the will of his father, Augustine Washington Sr., the land now known as Mount Vernon first was willed to this man's elder brother Lawrence Washington. However, the will instructed that in the case Lawrence should die without an heir the property would go to Augustine Jr., provided that he gave the Popes Creek property, known as "Wakefield", to George Washington. Augustine decided instead to keep the Popes Creek property and so George got the property now known as Mount Vernon.

Westmoreland County voters elected Augustine Jr. as one of their representatives in the Virginia House of Burgesses following the death of Robert Vaulx on August 24, 1754, and then elected him to the following term, so he served (part-time) from 1754 to 1758. He also was a member of the Ohio Company.

In 1753, he inherited his brother Lawrence's share in Accokeek Furnace near Stafford, Virginia.

Notes

References
 Tyler, Lyon Gardiner, ed. Encyclopedia of Virginia Biography. Volume 1. New York: Lewis Historical Publishing Company, 1915. . Retrieved July 15, 2011.

External links
 Photo of Augustine Washington II's grave marker

1720 births
1764 deaths
American people of English descent
American people of French descent
American planters
British North American Anglicans
Virginia colonial people
Augustine Jr.
People educated at Appleby Grammar School